Evecliptopera is a monotypic moth genus in the family Geometridae described by Inoue in 1982. Its only species, Evecliptopera decurrens, first described by Frederic Moore in 1888, is found in northern India, Nepal, south-western China, Japan, the Russian Far East and Taiwan.

The larvae feed on Akebia species.

Subspecies
Evecliptopera decurrens decurrens (India, Nepal, China)
Evecliptopera decurrens acreta (Prout, 1940) (Taiwan)
Evecliptopera decurrens excurrens (Prout, 1930)
Evecliptopera decurrens illitata (Wileman, 1911) (Japan)
Evecliptopera decurrens insurgens (Prout, 1930)

References

Cidariini
Monotypic moth genera
Moths of Asia